The 2019–20 Texas Longhorns women's basketball team represented the University of Texas at Austin in the 2019–20 NCAA Division I women's basketball season. It was head coach Karen Aston's eighth season at Texas. The Longhorns were members of the Big 12 Conference and played their home games at the Frank Erwin Center.

The Longhorns finished the season 19–11, 11–7 in Big 12 play to finish in third place.  The Big 12 Tournament, NCAA women's basketball tournament and WNIT were all cancelled before they began due to the COVID-19 pandemic.

Previous season
The Longhorns finished the season 23–10, 12–6 in Big 12 play to finish in third place. They advanced to the championship game of the Big 12 women's basketball tournament where they lost to Iowa State. They received an at-large bid to the NCAA women's basketball tournament, as a 10th seed in the Portland Regional, where they lost to 7th seed Indiana in the first round.

Offseason

Recruits

Sources:

Roster

Schedule
Source:

|-
!colspan=12 style=| Exhibition

|-
!colspan=12 style=| Non-conference regular season

|-
!colspan=12 style=| Big 12 regular season

|-
!colspan=12 style=| Big 12 Women's Tournament

Rankings

^Coaches did not release a Week 2 poll and the AP does not release a poll after the NCAA tournament, but the Coaches poll does.

2019–20 media

Television and radio information
Most University of Texas home games were shown on the Longhorn Network, with national telecasts on the Big 12 Conference's television partners. On the radio, women's basketball games aired on KTXX-HD4 "105.3 The Bat", with select games on KTXX-FM 104.9.

See also
 2019–20 Texas Longhorns men's basketball team

References

Texas Longhorns women's basketball seasons
Texas
Texas Longhorns